This is a list of the bird species recorded in Pakistan. The avifauna of Pakistan include a total of 792 species. The chukar (Alectoris chukar) is the official national bird of Pakistan, and the shaheen falcon is the symbolic icon of the Pakistan Air Force and Pakistan Avicultural Foundation, one bird is endemic.

This list's taxonomic treatment (designation and sequence of orders, families and species) and nomenclature (common and scientific names) generally follow the conventions of The Clements Checklist of Birds of the World, 2022 edition. The family accounts at the beginning of each heading reflect this taxonomy, as do the species counts found in each family account. Accidental species are included in the total species count for Pakistan.

The following tags have been used to highlight several categories. The commonly occurring native species do not fall into any of these categories.

(V) Vagrant - a species that rarely or accidentally occurs in Pakistan
(Ex) Extirpated - a species that no longer occurs in Pakistan but exists in other places
(E)Endemic-a species found only in Pakistan

Ducks, geese, and waterfowl

Order: AnseriformesFamily: Anatidae

Anatidae includes the ducks and most duck-like waterfowl, such as geese and swans. These birds are adapted to an aquatic existence with webbed feet, flattened bills, and feathers that are excellent at shedding water due to an oily coating.

Fulvous whistling-duck, Dendrocygna bicolor
Lesser whistling-duck, Dendrocygna javanica
Greater white-fronted goose, Anser albifrons
Lesser white-fronted goose, Anser erythropus
Bar-headed goose, Anser indicus
Graylag goose, Anser anser
Mute swan, Cygnus olor (V)
Tundra swan, Cygnus columbianus (V)
Whooper swan, Cygnus cygnus 
Knob-billed duck, Sarkidiornis melanotos
Ruddy shelduck, Tadorna ferruginea
Common shelduck, Tadorna tadorna
Cotton pygmy-goose, Nettapus coromandelianus
Baikal teal, Sibirionetta formosa (V)
Garganey, Spatula querquedula
Northern shoveler, Spatula clypeata
Gadwall, Mareca strepera
Falcated duck, Mareca falcata 
Eurasian wigeon, Mareca penelope
Indian spot-billed duck, Anas poecilorhyncha
Mallard, Anas platyrhynchos
Northern pintail, Anas acuta
Green-winged teal, Anas crecca
Marbled teal, Marmaronetta angustirostris
Red-crested pochard, Netta rufina
Common pochard, Aythya ferina
Ferruginous duck, Aythya nyroca
Baer's pochard, Aythya baeri (V)
Tufted duck, Aythya fuligula
Greater scaup, Aythya marila
Velvet scoter, Melanitta fusca
Long-tailed duck, Clangula hyemalis 
Common goldeneye, Bucephala clangula
Smew, Mergellus albellus
Common merganser, Mergus merganser
Red-breasted merganser, Mergus serrator 
White-headed duck, Oxyura leucocephala

Pheasants, grouse, and allies 
Order: GalliformesFamily: Phasianidae

The Phasianidae are a family of terrestrial birds which consists of quails, partridges, snowcocks, francolins, spurfowls, tragopans, monals, pheasants, peafowls and jungle fowls. In general, they are plump (although they vary in size) and have broad, relatively short wings. Of most species the numbers have declined considerably over the last decennia.

Indian peafowl, Pavo cristatus
See-see partridge, Ammoperdix griseogularis
Common quail, Coturnix coturnix
Rain quail, Coturnix coromandelica
Chukar, Alectoris chukar is the National bird of Pakistan.
Tibetan snowcock, Tetraogallus tibetanus
Himalayan snowcock, Tetraogallus himalayensis
Jungle bush-quail, Perdicula asiatica
Black francolin, Francolinus francolinus
Gray francolin, Ortygornis pondicerianus
Red junglefowl, Gallus gallus
Himalayan monal, Lophophorus impejanus
Snow partridge, Lerwa lerwa
Western tragopan, Tragopan melanocephalus
Cheer pheasant, Catreus wallichii
Kalij pheasant, Lophura leucomelanos
Koklass pheasant, Pucrasia macrolopha

Flamingos

Order: PhoenicopteriformesFamily: Phoenicopteridae

Flamingos filter-feed on shellfish and algae. Their oddly shaped beaks are specially adapted to separate mud and silt from the food they consume and, uniquely, are used upside-down.

Greater flamingo, Phoenicopterus roseus
Lesser flamingo, Phoenicopterus minor

Grebes

Order: PodicipediformesFamily: Podicipedidae

Grebes are small to medium-large freshwater diving birds. They have lobed toes and are excellent swimmers and divers. However, they have their feet placed far back on the body, making them quite ungainly on land.

Little grebe, Tachybaptus ruficollis
Horned grebe, Podiceps auritus
Red-necked grebe, Podiceps grisegena
Great crested grebe, Podiceps cristatus
Eared grebe, Podiceps nigricollis

Pigeons and doves

Order: ColumbiformesFamily: Columbidae

Pigeons and doves are stout-bodied birds with short necks and short slender bills with a fleshy cere.

Rock pigeon, Columba livia
Hill pigeon, Columba rupestris
Snow pigeon, Columba leuconota
Stock dove, Columba oenas (V)
Yellow-eyed pigeon, Columba eversmanni
Common wood-pigeon, Columba palumbus
Speckled wood-pigeon, Columba hodgsonii
European turtle-dove, Streptopelia turtur 
Oriental turtle-dove, Streptopelia orientalis
Eurasian collared-dove, Streptopelia decaocto
Red collared-dove, Streptopelia tranquebarica
Spotted dove, Spilopelia chinensis
Laughing dove, Spilopelia senegalensis
Namaqua dove, Oena capensis (V)
Asian emerald dove, Chalcophaps indica
Yellow-footed green-pigeon, Treron phoenicoptera
Wedge-tailed green-pigeon, Treron sphenurus 
Orange-breasted green-pigeon, Treron bicinctus
Thick-billed green pigeon,Treron curvirostra

Sandgrouse

Order: PterocliformesFamily: Pteroclidae

Sandgrouse have small, pigeon like heads and necks, but sturdy compact bodies. They have long pointed wings and sometimes tails and a fast direct flight. Flocks fly to watering holes at dawn and dusk. Their legs are feathered down to the toes.

Tibetan sandgrouse, Syrrhaptes tibetanus
Pin-tailed sandgrouse, Pterocles alchata
Chestnut-bellied sandgrouse, Pterocles exustus
Spotted sandgrouse, Pterocles senegallus
Black-bellied sandgrouse, Pterocles orientalis
Crowned sandgrouse, Pterocles coronatus
Lichtenstein's sandgrouse, Pterocles lichtensteinii
Painted sandgrouse, Pterocles indicus
Tibetan sandgrouse, Syrrhaptes tibetanus

Bustards
Order: OtidiformesFamily: Otididae

Bustards are large terrestrial birds mainly associated with dry open country and steppes in the Old World. They are omnivorous and nest on the ground. They walk steadily on strong legs and big toes, pecking for food as they go. They have long broad wings with "fingered" wingtips and striking patterns in flight. Many have interesting mating displays. Their numbers have declined considerably due to hunting.

Great bustard, Otis tarda
Great Indian bustard, Ardeotis nigriceps
Macqueen's bustard, Chlamydotis macqueenii
Lesser florican, Sypheotides indicus
Little bustard, Tetrax tetrax

Cuckoos
Order: CuculiformesFamily: Cuculidae

The family Cuculidae includes cuckoos, roadrunners and anis. These birds are of variable size with slender bodies, long tails and strong legs. The Old World cuckoos are brood parasites.

Greater coucal, Centropus sinensis
Lesser coucal, Centropus bengalensis (A)
Sirkeer malkoha, Taccocua leschenaultii
Pied cuckoo, Clamator jacobinus
Asian koel, Eudynamys scolopacea
Plaintive cuckoo, Cacomantis merulinus
Gray-bellied cuckoo, Cacomantis passerinus
Large hawk-cuckoo, Hierococcyx sparverioides
Common hawk-cuckoo, Hierococcyx varius
Lesser cuckoo, Cuculus poliocephalus
Indian cuckoo, Cuculus micropterus
Himalayan cuckoo, Cuculus saturatus
Common cuckoo, Cuculus canorus
Oriental cuckoo, Cuculus optatus

Nightjars and allies
Order: CaprimulgiformesFamily: Caprimulgidae

Nightjars are medium-sized nocturnal birds that usually nest on the ground. They have long wings, short legs and very short bills. Most have small feet, of little use for walking, and long pointed wings. Their soft plumage is camouflaged to resemble bark or leaves.

Gray nightjar, Caprimulgus jotaka
Eurasian nightjar, Caprimulgus europaeus
Egyptian nightjar, Caprimulgus aegyptius
Sykes's nightjar, Caprimulgus mahrattensis
Large-tailed nightjar, Caprimulgus macrurus
Indian nightjar, Caprimulgus asiaticus
Savanna nightjar, Caprimulgus affinis

Swifts
Order: CaprimulgiformesFamily: Apodidae

Swifts are small birds which spend the majority of their lives flying. These birds have very short legs and never settle voluntarily on the ground, perching instead only on vertical surfaces. Many swifts have long swept-back wings which resemble a crescent or boomerang. There are 9 species which have been recorded in Pakistan.

White-throated needletail, Hirundapus caudacutus
Himalayan swiftlet, Aerodramus brevirostris
Alpine swift, Tachymarptis melba
Common swift, Apus apus
Pallid swift, Apus pallidus
Blyth's swift, Apus leuconyx
Little swift, Apus affinis
House swift, Apus nipalensis
Asian palm-swift, Cypsiurus balasiensis

Rails, gallinules, and coots
Order: GruiformesFamily: Rallidae

Rallidae is a large family of small to medium-sized birds which includes the rails, crakes, coots and gallinules. Typically they inhabit dense vegetation in damp environments near lakes, swamps or rivers. In general they are shy and secretive birds, making them difficult to observe. Most species have strong legs and long toes which are well adapted to soft uneven surfaces. They tend to have short, rounded wings and to be weak fliers.

Water rail, Rallus aquaticus
Corn crake, Crex crex (V)
Slaty-breasted rail, Lewinia striata
Spotted crake, Porzana porzana
Eurasian moorhen, Gallinula chloropus
Eurasian coot, Fulica atra
Gray-headed swamphen, Porphyrio poliocephalus
Watercock, Gallicrex cinerea
White-breasted waterhen, Amaurornis phoenicurus
Slaty-legged crake, Rallina eurizonoides
Ruddy-breasted crake, Zapornia fusca
Brown crake, Zapornia akool
Little crake, Zapornia parva
Baillon's crake, Zapornia pusilla

Cranes
Order: GruiformesFamily: Gruidae

Cranes are large, long-legged and long-necked birds. Unlike the similar-looking but unrelated herons, cranes fly with necks outstretched, not pulled back. Most have elaborate and noisy courting displays or "dances". In this country numbers have declined as they are sought after as pet birds and hunted in the North-West in particular. The sarus crane which is found in abundant numbers in India has almost disappeared in Pakistan although a lone pair was sighted in 2011 in the tharparker area after 10 years. This decline is due to hunting.

Demoiselle crane, Anthropoides virgo
Siberian crane, Leucogeranus leucogeranus (Ex?)
Sarus crane, Antigone antigone
Common crane, Grus grus
Hooded crane, Grus monacha(V)

Thick-knees
Order: CharadriiformesFamily: Burhinidae

The thick-knees are a group of largely tropical waders in the family Burhinidae. They are found worldwide within the tropical zone, with some species also breeding in temperate Europe and Australia. They are medium to large waders with strong black or yellow-black bills, large yellow eyes and cryptic plumage. Despite being classed as waders, most species have a preference for arid or semi-arid habitats.

Eurasian thick-knee, Burhinus oedicnemus
Indian thick-knee, Burhinus indicus
Great thick-knee, Esacus recurvirostris

Stilts and avocets

Order: CharadriiformesFamily: Recurvirostridae

Recurvirostridae is a family of large wading birds, which includes the avocets and stilts. The avocets have long legs and long up-curved bills. The stilts have extremely long legs and long, thin, straight bills. There are 2 species which have been recorded in Pakistan.

Black-winged stilt, Himantopus himantopus
Pied avocet, Recurvirostra avosetta

Ibisbill
Order: CharadriiformesFamily: Ibidorhynchidae

The ibisbill is related to the waders, but is sufficiently distinctive to be a family unto itself. The adult is grey with a white belly, red legs, a long down curved bill, and a black face and breast band.

Ibisbill, Ibidorhyncha struthersii

Oystercatchers
Order: CharadriiformesFamily: Haematopodidae

The oystercatchers are large and noisy plover-like birds, with strong bills used for smashing or prising open molluscs.

Eurasian oystercatcher, Haematopus ostralegus

Plovers and lapwings

Order: CharadriiformesFamily: Charadriidae

The family Charadriidae includes the plovers, dotterels and lapwings. They are small to medium-sized birds with compact bodies, short, thick necks and long, usually pointed, wings. They are found in open country worldwide, mostly in habitats near water.

Black-bellied plover, Pluvialis squatarola
European golden-plover, Pluvialis apricaria 
Pacific golden-plover, Pluvialis fulva
Northern lapwing, Vanellus vanellus
River lapwing, Vanellus duvaucelii (V)
Yellow-wattled lapwing, Vanellus malabaricus
Gray-headed lapwing, Vanellus cinereus (V)
Red-wattled lapwing, Vanellus indicus
Sociable lapwing, Vanellus gregarius
White-tailed lapwing, Vanellus leucurus
Lesser sand-plover, Charadrius mongolus
Greater sand-plover, Charadrius leschenaultii
Kentish plover, Charadrius alexandrinus
Common ringed plover, Charadrius hiaticula
Little ringed plover, Charadrius dubius

Painted-snipe

Order: CharadriiformesFamily: Rostratulidae

Painted-snipe are short-legged, long-billed birds similar in shape to the true snipes, but more brightly coloured.

Greater painted-snipe, Rostratula benghalensis

Jacanas
Order: CharadriiformesFamily: Jacanidae

The jacanas are a group of tropical waders in the family Jacanidae. They are found throughout the tropics. They are identifiable by their huge feet and claws which enable them to walk on floating vegetation in the shallow lakes that are their preferred habitat.

Pheasant-tailed jacana, Hydrophasianus chirurgus
Bronze-winged jacana, Metopidius indicus

Sandpipers and allies

Order: CharadriiformesFamily: Scolopacidae

Scolopacidae is a large diverse family of small to medium-sized shorebirds including the sandpipers, curlews, godwits, shanks, tattlers, woodcocks, snipes, dowitchers and phalaropes. The majority of these species eat small invertebrates picked out of the mud or soil. Variation in length of legs and bills enables multiple species to feed in the same habitat, particularly on the coast, without direct competition for food. There are 30 species which have been recorded in Pakistan.

Whimbrel, Numenius phaeopus
Eurasian curlew, Numenius arquata
Bar-tailed godwit, Limosa lapponica
Black-tailed godwit, Limosa limosa
Ruddy turnstone, Arenaria interpres
Great knot, Calidris tenuirostris
Red knot, Calidris canutus (V)
Ruff, Calidris pugnax
Broad-billed sandpiper, Calidris falcinellus
Sharp-tailed sandpiper, Calidris acuminata (V)
Curlew sandpiper, Calidris ferruginea
Temminck's stint, Calidris temminckii
Sanderling, Calidris alba
Dunlin, Calidris alpina
Little stint, Calidris minuta
Jack snipe, Lymnocryptes minimus
Eurasian woodcock, Scolopax rusticola
Solitary snipe, Gallinago solitaria
Wood snipe, Gallinago nemoricola
Common snipe, Gallinago gallinago
Pin-tailed snipe, Gallinago stenura
Terek sandpiper, Xenus cinereus
Red-necked phalarope, Phalaropus lobatus
Red phalarope, Phalaropus fulicaria (V)
Common sandpiper, Actitis hypoleucos
Green sandpiper, Tringa ochropus
Spotted redshank, Tringa erythropus
Common greenshank, Tringa nebularia
Marsh sandpiper, Tringa stagnatilis
Wood sandpiper, Tringa glareola
Common redshank, Tringa totanus

Buttonquail
Order: CharadriiformesFamily: Turnicidae

The buttonquails are small, drab, running birds which resemble the true quails. The female is the brighter of the sexes and initiates courtship. The male incubates the eggs and tends the young.

Small buttonquail, Turnix sylvatica
Yellow-legged buttonquail, Turnix tanki
Barred buttonquail, Turnix suscitator

Crab-plover
Order: CharadriiformesFamily: Dromadidae

The crab-plover is related to the waders. It resembles a plover but with very long grey legs and a strong heavy black bill similar to a tern. It has black-and-white plumage, a long neck, partially webbed feet and a bill designed for eating crabs.

Crab-plover, Dromas ardeola

Pratincoles and coursers

Order: CharadriiformesFamily: Glareolidae

Glareolidae is a family of wading birds comprising the pratincoles, which have short legs, long pointed wings and long forked tails, and the coursers, which have long legs, short wings and long, pointed bills which curve downwards. There are 5 species which have been recorded in Pakistan.

Cream-colored courser, Cursorius cursor
Indian courser, Cursorius coromandelicus
Collared pratincole, Glareola pratincola
Oriental pratincole, Glareola maldivarum
Small pratincole, Glareola lactea

Skuas and jaegers
Order: CharadriiformesFamily: Stercorariidae

The family Stercorariidae are, in general, medium to large birds, typically with grey or brown plumage, often with white markings on the wings. They nest on the ground in temperate and arctic regions and are long-distance migrants. There are 2 species which have been recorded in Pakistan.

Pomarine jaeger, Stercorarius pomarinus
Parasitic jaeger, Stercorarius parasiticus

Gulls, terns, and skimmers

Order: CharadriiformesFamily: Laridae

Laridae is a family of medium to large seabirds, the gulls, terns, and skimmers. Gulls are typically grey or white, often with black markings on the head or wings. They have stout, longish bills and webbed feet. Terns are a group of generally medium to large seabirds typically with grey or white plumage, often with black markings on the head. Most terns hunt fish by diving but some pick insects off the surface of fresh water. Terns are generally long-lived birds, with several species known to live in excess of 30 years. Skimmers are a small family of tropical tern-like birds. They have an elongated lower mandible which they use to feed by flying low over the water surface and skimming the water for small fish.

Black-legged kittiwake, Rissa tridactyla (V)
Slender-billed gull, Chroicocephalus genei
Black-headed gull, Chroicocephalus ridibundus
Brown-headed gull, Chroicocephalus brunnicephalus
Little gull, Hydrocoloeus minutus (V)
Sooty gull, Ichthyaetus hemprichii
Pallas's gull, Ichthyaetus ichthyaetus
Common gull, Larus canus
Herring gull, Larus cachinnans
Caspian gull, Larus cachinnans
Lesser black-backed gull, Larus fuscus
Brown noddy, Anous stolidus 
Bridled tern, Onychoprion anaethetus
Little tern, Sternula albifrons 
Saunders's tern, Sternula saundersi
Gull-billed tern, Gelochelidon nilotica
Caspian tern, Hydroprogne caspia
White-winged tern, Chlidonias leucopterus
Whiskered tern, Chlidonias hybrida
Common tern, Sterna hirundo
Black-bellied tern, Sterna acuticauda
River tern, Sterna aurantia
White-cheeked tern, Sterna repressa
Great crested tern, Thalasseus bergii
Sandwich tern, Thalasseus sandvicensis
Lesser crested tern, Thalasseus bengalensis
Indian skimmer, Rynchops albicollis

Tropicbirds

Order: PhaethontiformesFamily: Phaethontidae

Tropicbirds are slender white birds of tropical oceans, with exceptionally long central tail feathers. Their heads and long wings have black markings.

Red-billed tropicbird, Phaethon aethereus
Red-tailed tropicbird, Phaethon rubricauda

Loons

Order: GaviiformesFamily: Gaviidae

Loons, The loons are the size of a large duck or small goose, which they somewhat resemble in shape when swimming. There are 2 species which have been recorded in Pakistan.

Red-throated loon, Gavia stellata
Common loon, Gavia immer (V)

Southern storm-petrels

Order: ProcellariiformesFamily: Oceanitidae

The southern storm-petrels are relatives of the petrels and are the smallest seabirds. They feed on planktonic crustaceans and small fish picked from the surface, typically while hovering. The flight is fluttering and sometimes bat-like.

Wilson's storm-petrel, Oceanites oceanicus

Shearwaters and petrels

Order: ProcellariiformesFamily: Procellariidae

The procellariids are the main group of medium-sized "true petrels", characterised by united nostrils with medium septum and a long outer functional primary.

Jouanin's petrel, Bulweria fallax (V)
Flesh-footed shearwater, Ardenna carneipes
Wedge-tailed shearwater, Ardenna pacificus (V)
Short-tailed shearwater, Ardenna tenuirostris (V)
Tropical shearwater, Puffinus bailloni
Persian shearwater, Puffinus persicus

Storks

Order: CiconiiformesFamily: Ciconiidae

Storks are large, long-legged, long-necked, wading birds with long, stout bills. Storks are mute, but bill-clattering is an important mode of communication at the nest. Their nests can be large and may be reused for many years. Many species are migratory.

Asian openbill, Anastomus oscitans
Black stork, Ciconia nigra
Asian woolly-necked stork, Ciconia episcopus 
White stork, Ciconia ciconia
Black-necked stork, Ephippiorhynchus asiaticus
Greater adjutant, Leptoptilos dubius (V)
Painted stork, Mycteria leucocephala

Boobies and gannets

Order: SuliformesFamily: Sulidae

The sulids comprise the gannets and boobies. Both groups are medium to large coastal seabirds that plunge-dive for fish.

Masked booby, Sula dactylatra

Anhingas

Order: SuliformesFamily: Anhingidae

Darters are often called "snake-birds" because of their long thin neck, which gives a snake-like appearance when they swim with their bodies submerged. The males have black and dark-brown plumage, an erectile crest on the nape and a larger bill than the female. The females have much paler plumage especially on the neck and underparts. The darters have completely webbed feet and their legs are short and set far back on the body. Their plumage is somewhat permeable, like that of cormorants, and they spread their wings to dry after diving.

Oriental darter, Anhinga melanogaster

Cormorants and shags

Order: SuliformesFamily: Phalacrocoracidae

Phalacrocoracidae is a family of medium to large coastal, fish-eating seabirds that includes cormorants and shags. Plumage colouration varies, with the majority having mainly dark plumage, some species being black-and-white and a few being colourful.

Little cormorant, Microcarbo niger
Great cormorant, Phalacrocorax carbo
Indian cormorant, Phalacrocorax fuscicollis
Pygmy cormorant, Microcarbo pygmeus (V)

Pelicans
Order: PelecaniformesFamily: Pelecanidae

Pelicans are large water birds with a distinctive pouch under their beak. As with other members of the order Pelecaniformes, they have webbed feet with four toes.

Great white pelican, Pelecanus onocrotalus
Spot-billed pelican, Pelecanus philippensis 
Dalmatian pelican, Pelecanus crispus

Herons, egrets, and bitterns

Order: PelecaniformesFamily: Ardeidae

The family Ardeidae contains the bitterns, herons and egrets. Herons and egrets are medium to large wading birds with long necks and legs. Bitterns tend to be shorter necked and more wary. Members of Ardeidae fly with their necks retracted, unlike other long-necked birds such as storks, ibises and spoonbills.

Great bittern, Botaurus stellaris
Yellow bittern, Ixobrychus sinensis
Little bittern, Ixobrychus minutus
Cinnamon bittern, Ixobrychus cinnamomeus
Black bittern, Ixobrychus flavicollis
Gray heron, Ardea cinerea
Goliath heron, Ardea goliath (V)
Purple heron, Ardea purpurea
Great egret, Ardea alba
Intermediate egret, Ardea intermedia
Little egret, Egretta garzetta
Western reef-heron, Egretta gularis
Cattle egret, Bubulcus ibis
Squacco heron, Ardeola ralloides (V)
Indian pond-heron, Ardeola grayii
Chinese pond-heron, Ardeola bacchus (V)
Striated heron, Butorides striata
Black-crowned night-heron, Nycticorax nycticorax

Ibises and spoonbills

Order: PelecaniformesFamily: Threskiornithidae

Threskiornithidae is a family of large terrestrial and wading birds which includes the ibises and spoonbills. They have long, broad wings with 11 primary and about 20 secondary feathers. They are strong fliers and despite their size and weight, very capable soarers.

Glossy ibis, Plegadis falcinellus
Black-headed ibis, Threskiornis melanocephalus
Red-naped ibis, Pseudibis papillosa
Eurasian spoonbill, Platalea leucorodia

Osprey

Order: AccipitriformesFamily: Pandionidae

The family Pandionidae contains only one species, the osprey. The osprey is a medium-large raptor which is a specialist fish-eater with a worldwide distribution.

Osprey, Pandion haliaetus

Hawks, eagles, and kites

Order: AccipitriformesFamily: Accipitridae

Accipitridae is a family of birds of prey, which includes hawks, eagles, kites, harriers and Old World vultures. These birds have powerful hooked beaks for tearing flesh from their prey, strong legs, powerful talons and keen eyesight.

Black-winged kite, Elanus caeruleus
Bearded vulture, Gypaetus barbatus
Egyptian vulture, Neophron percnopterus
European honey buzzard,  Pernis apivorus
Oriental honey-buzzard, Pernis ptilorhynchus
Red-headed vulture, Sarcogyps calvus
Cinereous vulture, Aegypius monachus
White-rumped vulture, Gyps bengalensis
Indian vulture, Gyps indicus
Slender-billed vulture, Gyps tenuirostris
Himalayan griffon, Gyps himalayensis
Eurasian griffon, Gyps fulvus
Crested serpent-eagle, Spilornis cheela
Short-toed snake-eagle, Circaetus gallicus
Mountain hawk-eagle, Nisaetus nipalensis
Black eagle, Ictinaetus malaiensis
Lesser spotted eagle, Clanga pomarina
Indian spotted eagle, Clanga hastata
Greater spotted eagle, Clanga clanga
Booted eagle, Hieraaetus pennatus
Tawny eagle, Aquila rapax
Steppe eagle, Aquila nipalensis
Imperial eagle, Aquila heliaca
Golden eagle, Aquila chrysaetos
Bonelli's eagle, Aquila fasciata
White-eyed buzzard, Butastur teesa
Eurasian marsh-harrier, Circus aeruginosus
Hen harrier, Circus cyaneus
Pallid harrier, Circus macrourus
Pied harrier, Circus melanoleucos
Montagu's harrier, Circus pygargus
Shikra, Accipiter badius
Besra, Accipiter virgatus
Eurasian sparrowhawk, Accipiter nisus
Northern goshawk, Accipiter gentilis 
Black kite, Milvus migrans
Brahminy kite, Haliastur indus
White-tailed eagle, Haliaeetus albicilla
Pallas's fish eagle, Haliaeetus leucoryphus
White-bellied sea-eagle, Haliaeetus leucogaster
Common buzzard, Buteo buteo
Himalayan buzzard, Buteo burmanicus
Eastern buzzard, Buteo japonicus
Long-legged buzzard, Buteo rufinus
Upland buzzard, Buteo hemilasius

Barn owls
Order: StrigiformesFamily: Tytonidae

Barn owls are medium to large owls with large heads and characteristic heart-shaped faces. They have long strong legs with powerful talons.

Barn owl, Tyto alba

Owls
Order: StrigiformesFamily: Strigidae

The typical owls are small to large solitary nocturnal birds of prey. They have large forward-facing eyes and ears, a hawk-like beak and a conspicuous circle of feathers around each eye called a facial disk.

Mountain scops-owl, Otus spilocephalus
Indian scops-owl, Otus bakkamoena
Collared scops-owl, Otus lettia
Eurasian scops-owl, Otus scops
Pallid scops-owl, Otus brucei
Oriental scops-owl, Otus sunia
Eurasian eagle-owl, Bubo bubo
Rock eagle-owl, Bubo bengalensis
Dusky eagle-owl, Bubo coromandus
Snowy owl, Bubo scandiacus (V)
Brown fish-owl, Ketupa zeylonensis
Collared owlet, Taenioptynx brodiei
Asian barred owlet, Glaucidium cuculoides
Spotted owlet, Athene brama
Little owl, Athene noctua
Mottled wood-owl, Strix ocellata
Brown wood-owl, Strix leptogrammica
Tawny owl, Strix aluco
Himalayan owl, Strix nivicolum
Desert owl, Strix hadorami
Long-eared owl, Asio otus
Short-eared owl, Asio flammeus
Brown boobook, Ninox scutulata
Boreal owl, Aegolius funereus

Hoopoes
Order: BucerotiformesFamily: Upupidae

Hoopoes have black, white and orangey-pink colouring with a large erectile crest on their head.

Eurasian hoopoe, Upupa epops

Hornbills
Order: BucerotiformesFamily: Bucerotidae

Hornbills are a group of birds whose bill is shaped like a cow's horn, but without a twist, sometimes with a casque on the upper mandible. Frequently, the bill is brightly coloured.

Indian gray hornbill, Ocyceros birostris
Oriental pied hornbill, Anthracoceros albirostris

Kingfishers
Order: CoraciiformesFamily: Alcedinidae

Kingfishers are medium-sized birds with large heads, long, pointed bills, short legs and stubby tails.

Common kingfisher, Alcedo atthis
White-throated kingfisher, Halcyon smyrnensis
Black-capped kingfisher, Halcyon pileata (V)
Crested kingfisher, Megaceryle lugubris
Pied kingfisher, Ceryle rudis

Bee-eaters
Order: CoraciiformesFamily: Meropidae

The bee-eaters are a group of near passerine birds in the family Meropidae. Most species are found in Africa but others occur in southern Europe, Madagascar, Australia and New Guinea. They are characterised by richly coloured plumage, slender bodies and usually elongated central tail feathers. All are colourful and have long downturned bills and pointed wings, which give them a swallow-like appearance when seen from afar.

Asian green bee-eater, Merops orientalis
Blue-cheeked bee-eater, Merops persicus
Blue-tailed bee-eater, Merops philippinus
European bee-eater, Merops apiaster

Broadbills 
Order:Passeriformes Family:Eurylaimidae

Many of the species are brightly coloured birds that present broad heads, large eyes and a hooked, flat and broad beak. They range from 13 to 28 centimetres in length, and live in the dense canopies of wet forests, allowing them to hide despite their brightly coloured plumage. In Pakistan only one species has been recorded as a vagrant.

Long-tailed broadbill, Psarisomus dalhousiae (V)

Rollers
Order: CoraciiformesFamily: Coraciidae

Rollers resemble crows in size and build, but are more closely related to the kingfishers and bee-eaters. They share the colourful appearance of those groups with blues and browns predominating. The two inner front toes are connected, but the outer toe is not.

European roller, Coracias garrulus
Indian roller, Coracias benghalensis
Dollarbird, Eurystomus orientalis

Asian barbets
Order: PiciformesFamily: Megalaimidae

The Asian barbets are plump birds, with short necks and large heads. They get their name from the bristles which fringe their heavy bills. Most species are brightly coloured.

Coppersmith barbet, Psilopogon haemacephalus
Great barbet, Psilopogon virens
Brown-headed barbet, Psilopogon zeylanicus
Blue-throated barbet, Psilopogon asiaticus

Honeyguides
Order: PiciformesFamily: Indicatoridae

Honeyguides are among the few birds that feed on wax. They are named for the greater honeyguide which leads traditional honey-hunters to bees' nests and, after the hunters have harvested the honey, feeds on the remaining contents of the hive.

Yellow-rumped honeyguide, Indicator xanthonotus

Woodpeckers
Order: PiciformesFamily: Picidae

Woodpeckers are small to medium-sized birds with chisel-like beaks, short legs, stiff tails and long tongues used for capturing insects. Some species have feet with two toes pointing forward and two backward, while several species have only three toes. Many woodpeckers have the habit of tapping noisily on tree trunks with their beaks.

Eurasian wryneck, Jynx torquilla
Speckled piculet, Picumnus innominatus
Brown-capped pygmy woodpecker, Yungipicus nanus
Gray-capped pygmy woodpecker, Yungipicus canicapillus
Yellow-crowned woodpecker, Leiopicus mahrattensis
Brown-fronted woodpecker, Dendrocoptes auriceps
Rufous-bellied woodpecker, Dendrocopos hyperythrus
Fulvous-breasted woodpecker, Dendrocopos macei
Himalayan woodpecker, Dendrocopos himalayensis
Sind woodpecker, Dendrocopos assimilis (E)
Rufous woodpecker, Micropternus brachyurus
Black-rumped flameback, Dinopium benghalense
Scaly-bellied woodpecker, Picus squamatus
Gray-headed woodpecker, Picus canus
Lesser yellownape, Picus chlorolophus (V)

Falcons and caracaras
Order: FalconiformesFamily: Falconidae

Falconidae is a family of diurnal birds of prey. They differ from hawks, eagles and kites in that they kill with their beaks instead of their talons. Most species have declined rapidly due to their demand for the falcon hunting trade.

Lesser kestrel, Falco naumanni
Eurasian kestrel, Falco tinnunculus
Red-necked falcon, Falco chicquera
Red-footed falcon, Falco vespertinus 
Amur falcon, Falco amurensis
Sooty falcon, Falco concolor 
Merlin, Falco columbarius
Eurasian hobby, Falco subbuteo
Oriental hobby, Falco severus
Lanner falcon, Falco biarmicus
Laggar falcon, Falco jugger
Saker falcon, Falco cherrug
Gyrfalcon, Falco rusticolus
Peregrine falcon, Falco peregrinus
Shaheen falcon, Falco peregrinus peregrinator, is used in the logo of the Pakistani Air Force.
Barbary falcon, Falco peregrinus pelegrinoides

Old World parrots
Order: PsittaciformesFamily: Psittaculidae

Characteristic features of parrots include a strong curved bill, an upright stance, strong legs, and clawed zygodactyl feet. Many parrots are vividly coloured, and some are multi-coloured. Old World parrots are found from Africa east across south and southeast Asia and Oceania to Australia and New Zealand.

Alexandrine parakeet, Psittacula eupatria
Rose-ringed parakeet, Psittacula krameri
Slaty-headed parakeet, Psittacula himalayana
Plum-headed parakeet, Psittacula cyanocephala

Pittas
Order: PasseriformesFamily: Pittidae

Pittas are medium-sized by passerine standards and are stocky, with fairly long, strong legs, short tails and stout bills. Many are brightly coloured. They spend the majority of their time on wet forest floors, eating snails, insects and similar invertebrates.

Indian pitta, Pitta brachyura

Cuckooshrikes
Order: PasseriformesFamily: Campephagidae

The cuckooshrikes are small to medium-sized passerine birds. They are predominantly greyish with white and black, although some species are brightly coloured.

White-bellied minivet, Pericrocotus erythropygius
Small minivet, Pericrocotus cinnamomeus
Grey-chinned minivet,  Pericrocotus solaris
Long-tailed minivet, Pericrocotus ethologus
Scarlet minivet, Pericrocotus flammeus
Rosy minivet, Pericrocotus roseus
Large cuckooshrike, Coracina macei
Black-winged cuckooshrike, Coracina melaschistos
Black-headed cuckooshrike, Coracina melanoptera

Vireos, shrike-babblers, and erpornis
Order: PasseriformesFamily: Vireonidae

The vireos are a group of small to medium-sized passerine birds. They are typically greenish in color and resemble wood warblers apart from their heavier bills.

White-browed shrike-babbler, Pteruthius aeralatus
Green shrike-babbler, Pteruthius xanthochlorus

Old World orioles
Order: PasseriformesFamily: Oriolidae

The Old World orioles are colourful passerine birds. They are not related to the New World orioles.

Eurasian golden oriole, Oriolus oriolus
Indian golden oriole, Oriolus kundoo
Black-naped oriole, Oriolus chinensis
Black-hooded oriole, Oriolus xanthornus
Maroon oriole, Oriolus traillii

Vangas, helmetshrikes, and allies
Order: PasseriformesFamily: Vangidae

The Vangidae comprises a group of often shrike-like medium-sized birds distributed from Asia to Africa. Many species in this family were previously classified elsewhere in other families.

Common woodshrike, Tephrodornis pondicerianus

Ioras
Order: PasseriformesFamily: Aegithinidae

The ioras are bulbul-like birds of open forest or thorn scrub, but whereas that group tends to be drab in colouration, ioras are sexually dimorphic, with the males being brightly plumaged in yellows and greens.

Common iora, Aegithina tiphia
White-tailed iora, Aegithina nigrolutea

Fantails
Order: PasseriformesFamily: Rhipiduridae

The fantails are small insectivorous birds which are specialist aerial feeders.

White-throated fantail, Rhipidura albicollis
White-browed fantail, Rhipidura aureola

Drongos
Order: PasseriformesFamily: Dicruridae

The drongos are mostly black or dark grey in colour, sometimes with metallic tints. They have long forked tails, and some Asian species have elaborate tail decorations. They have short legs and sit very upright when perched, like a shrike. They flycatch or take prey from the ground.

Black drongo, Dicrurus macrocercus
Ashy drongo, Dicrurus leucophaeus
White-bellied drongo, Dicrurus caerulescens
Hair-crested drongo, Dicrurus hottentottus

Monarch flycatchers
Order: PasseriformesFamily: Monarchidae

The monarch flycatchers are small to medium-sized insectivorous passerines which hunt by flycatching.

Black-naped monarch, Hypothymis azurea
Indian paradise flycatcher, Terpsiphone paradisi

Shrikes
Order: PasseriformesFamily: Laniidae

Shrikes are passerine birds known for their habit of catching other birds and small animals and impaling the uneaten portions of their bodies on thorns. A typical shrike's beak is hooked, like a bird of prey.

Red-backed shrike, Lanius collurio
Red-tailed shrike, Lanius phoenicuroides
Isabelline shrike, Lanius isabellinus
Brown shrike, Lanius cristatus
Bay-backed shrike, Lanius vittatus
Long-tailed shrike, Lanius schach
Gray-backed shrike, Lanius tephronotus
Great gray shrike, Lanius excubitor
Lesser gray shrike, Lanius minor (V)
Woodchat shrike, Lanius senator

Crows, jays, and magpies
Order: PasseriformesFamily: Corvidae

The family Corvidae includes crows, ravens, jays, choughs, magpies, treepies, nutcrackers and ground jays. Corvids are above average in size among the Passeriformes, and some of the larger species show high levels of intelligence.

Eurasian jay, Garrulus glandarius
Black-headed jay, Garrulus lanceolatus
Yellow-billed blue-magpie, Urocissa flavirostris
Red-billed blue-magpie, Urocissa erythroryncha 
Rufous treepie, Dendrocitta vagabunda
Gray treepie, Dendrocitta formosae
Eurasian magpie, Pica pica
Eurasian nutcracker, Nucifraga caryocatactes
Kashmir nutcracker, Nucifraga multipunctata
Red-billed chough, Pyrrhocorax pyrrhocorax
Yellow-billed chough, Pyrrhocorax graculus
Eurasian jackdaw, Corvus monedula
House crow, Corvus splendens
Rook, Corvus frugilegus
Carrion crow, Corvus corone
Hooded crow, Corvus cornix
Large-billed crow, Corvus macrorhynchos
Brown-necked raven, Corvus ruficollis
Common raven, Corvus corax

Fairy flycatchers
Order: PasseriformesFamily: Stenostiridae

Most of the species of this small family are found in Africa, though a few inhabit tropical Asia. They are not closely related to other birds called "flycatchers".

Yellow-bellied fairy-fantail, Chelidorhynx hypoxanthus 
Gray-headed canary-flycatcher, Culicicapa ceylonensis

Tits, chickadees, and titmice
Order: Passeriformes Family: Paridae

The Paridae are mainly small stocky woodland species with short stout bills. Some have crests. They are adaptable birds, with a mixed diet including seeds and insects. There are 10 species which have been recorded in Pakistan.

Fire-capped tit, Cephalopyrus flammiceps
Coal tit, Periparus ater
Rufous-naped tit, Periparus rufonuchalis
Rufous-vented tit, Periparus rubidiventris
Gray-crested tit, Lophophanes dichrous
Azure tit, Cyanistes cyanus 
Ground tit, Pseudopodoces humilis (A)
Green-backed tit, Parus monticolus
Great tit, Parus major
Cinereous tit, Parus cinereus
Himalayan black-lored tit, Parus xanthogenys
Yellow-breasted tit, Cyanistes flavipectus

Penduline tits
Order: PasseriformesFamily: Remizidae

The penduline tits are a group of small passerine birds related to the true tits. They are insectivores.

Eurasian penduline-tit, Remiz pendulinus
White-crowned penduline-tit, Remiz coronatus

Larks
Order: PasseriformesFamily: Alaudidae

Larks are small terrestrial birds with often extravagant songs and display flights. Most larks are fairly dull in appearance. Their food is insects and seeds.

Greater hoopoe-lark, Alaemon alaudipes
Bar-tailed lark, Ammomanes cincturus
Rufous-tailed lark, Ammomanes phoenicurus
Desert lark, Ammomanes deserti
Black-crowned sparrow-lark, Eremopterix nigriceps
Ashy-crowned sparrow-lark, Eremopterix grisea
Horsfield’s bushlark, Mirafra javanica
Indian bushlark, Mirafra erythroptera
Horned lark, Eremophila alpestris
Greater short-toed lark, Calandrella brachydactyla
Mongolian short-toed lark, Calandrella dukhunensis 
Hume's lark, Calandrella acutirostris
Bimaculated lark, Melanocorypha bimaculata
Turkestan short-toed lark, Alaudala heinei
Sand lark, Alaudala raytal
Eurasian skylark, Alauda arvensis
Oriental skylark, Alauda gulgula
Crested lark, Galerida cristata

Bearded reedling
Order: PasseriformesFamily: Panuridae

This species, the only one in its family, is found in reed beds throughout temperate Europe and Asia.

Bearded reedling, Panurus biarmicus (V)

Cisticolas and allies
Order: PasseriformesFamily: Cisticolidae

The Cisticolidae are warblers found mainly in warmer southern regions of the Old World. They are generally very small birds of drab brown or grey appearance found in open country such as grassland or scrub.

Common tailorbird, Orthotomus sutorius
Himalayan prinia, Prinia crinigera
Gray-crowned prinia, Prinia cinereocapilla
Rufous-fronted prinia, Prinia buchanani
Gray-breasted prinia, Prinia hodgsonii
Delicate prinia, Prinia lepida
Jungle prinia, Prinia sylvatica
Yellow-bellied prinia, Prinia flaviventris
Ashy prinia, Prinia socialis
Plain prinia, Prinia inornata
Zitting cisticola, Cisticola juncidis

Reed warblers and allies
Order: PasseriformesFamily: Acrocephalidae

The members of this family are usually rather large for "warblers". Most are rather plain olivaceous brown above with much yellow to beige below. They are usually found in open woodland, reedbeds, or tall grass. The family occurs mostly in southern to western Eurasia and surroundings, but it also ranges far into the Pacific, with some species in Africa.

Booted warbler, Iduna caligata
Sykes's warbler, Iduna rama
Upcher's warbler, Hippolais languida
Moustached warbler, Acrocephalus melanopogon
Sedge warbler, Acrocephalus schoenobaenus (V)
Paddyfield warbler, Acrocephalus agricola
Blunt-winged warbler, Acrocephalus concinens
Blyth's reed warbler, Acrocephalus dumetorum
Large-billed reed warbler, Acrocephalus orinus (V)
Eurasian reed warbler, Acrocephalus scirpaceus (V)
Great reed warbler, Acrocephalus arundinaceus (V)
Clamorous reed warbler, Acrocephalus stentoreus

Grassbirds and allies
Order: PasseriformesFamily: Locustellidae

Locustellidae are a family of small insectivorous songbirds found mainly in Eurasia, Africa, and the Australian region. They are smallish birds with tails that are usually long and pointed, and tend to be drab brownish or buffy all over.

Striated grassbird, Megalurus palustris
Long-billed bush warbler, Locustella major
Common grasshopper-warbler, Locustella naevia
Bristled grassbird, Schoenicola striatus

Swallows
Order: PasseriformesFamily: Hirundinidae

The family Hirundinidae is adapted to aerial feeding. They have a slender streamlined body, long pointed wings and a short bill with a wide gape. The feet are adapted to perching rather than walking, and the front toes are partially joined at the base.

Gray-throated martin, Riparia chinensis
Bank swallow, Riparia riparia
Pale sand martin, Riparia diluta
Eurasian crag-martin, Ptyonoprogne rupestris
Rock martin, Ptyonoprogne fuligula
Dusky crag-martin, Ptyonoprogne concolor
Barn swallow, Hirundo rustica
Wire-tailed swallow, Hirundo smithii
Red-rumped swallow, Cecropis daurica
Streak-throated swallow, Petrochelidon fluvicola
Common house-martin, Delichon urbica
Asian house-martin, Delichon dasypus

Bulbuls
Order: PasseriformesFamily: Pycnonotidae

Bulbuls are medium-sized songbirds. Some are colourful with yellow, red or orange vents, cheeks, throats or supercilia, but most are drab, with uniform olive-brown to black plumage. Some species have distinct crests.

Red-vented bulbul, Pycnonotus cafer
Red-whiskered bulbul, Pycnonotus jocosus 
Black-headed bulbul, Brachypodius melanocephalos
White-eared bulbul, Pycnonotus leucotis
Himalayan bulbul, Pycnonotus leucogenys
Black bulbul, Hypsipetes leucocephalus

Leaf warblers
Order: PasseriformesFamily: Phylloscopidae

Leaf warblers are a family of small insectivorous birds found mostly in Eurasia and ranging into Wallacea and Africa. The species are of various sizes, often green-plumaged above and yellow below, or more subdued with greyish-green to greyish-brown colours.

Hume's warbler, Phylloscopus humei
Brooks's leaf warbler, Phylloscopus subviridis
Lemon-rumped warbler, Phylloscopus chloronotus
Tytler's leaf warbler, Phylloscopus tytleri
Sulphur-bellied warbler, Phylloscopus griseolus
Tickell's leaf warbler, Phylloscopus affinis
Plain leaf warbler, Phylloscopus neglectus
Mountain chiffchaff, Phylloscopus sindianus
Common chiffchaff, Phylloscopus collybita
Green-crowned warbler, Phylloscopus burkii
Whistler's warbler, Phylloscopus whistleri
Green warbler, Phylloscopus nitidus
Greenish warbler, Phylloscopus trochiloides
Large-billed leaf warbler, Phylloscopus magnirostris
Western crowned warbler, Phylloscopus occipitalis
Willow warbler, Phylloscopus trochilus
Blyth's leaf warbler, Phylloscopus reguloides
Gray-hooded warbler, Phylloscopus xanthoschistos
Dusky warbler, Phylloscopus fuscatus

Bush warblers and allies 
Order: PasseriformesFamily: Scotocercidae

The members of this family are found throughout Africa, Asia, and Polynesia. Their taxonomy is in flux, and some authorities place some genera in other families.

Scrub warbler, Scotocerca inquieta
Gray-sided bush warbler, Cettia 'brunnifrons
Cetti's warbler, Cettia cetti
Brownish-flanked bush warbler, Horornis fortipes
Hume's bush warbler, Horornis brunnescens

Long-tailed tits
Order: Passeriformes Family: Aegithalidae

Long-tailed tits are a group of small passerine birds with medium to long tails. They make woven bag nests in trees. Most eat a mixed diet which includes insects.

White-browed tit-warbler, Leptopoecile sophiae
White-cheeked tit, Aegithalos leucogenys
Black-throated tit, Aegithalos concinnus
White-throated tit, Aegithalos niveogularis

Sylviid warblers, parrotbills, and allies
Order: PasseriformesFamily: Sylviidae

The family Sylviidae is a group of small insectivorous passerine birds. They mainly occur as breeding species, as the common name implies, in Europe, Asia and, to a lesser extent, Africa. Most are of generally undistinguished appearance, but many have distinctive songs.

Asian desert warbler, Curruca nana
Barred warbler, Curruca nisoria 
Lesser whitethroat, Curruca curruca
Eastern Orphean warbler, Curruca crassirostris
Menetries's warbler, Curruca mystacea
Greater whitethroat, Curruca communis
Yellow-eyed babbler, Chrysomma sinense
Jerdon's babbler, Chrysomma altirostre

White-eyes, yuhinas, and allies
Order: Passeriformes Family: Zosteropidae

The white-eyes are small and mostly undistinguished, their plumage above being generally some dull colour like greenish-olive, but some species have a white or bright yellow throat, breast or lower parts, and several have buff flanks. As their name suggests, many species have a white ring around each eye.

Indian white-eye, Zosterops palpebrosus

Tree-babblers, scimitar-babblers, and allies
Order: Passeriformes Family: Timaliidae

The babblers, or timaliids, are somewhat diverse in size and colouration, but are characterised by soft fluffy plumage.

Black-chinned babbler, Stachyridopsis pyrrhops
Rusty-cheeked scimitar-babbler, Erythrogenys erythrogenys

Ground babblers and allies 
Order: PasseriformesFamily: Pellorneidae

These small to medium-sized songbirds have soft fluffy plumage but are otherwise rather diverse. Members of the genus Illadopsis are found in forests, but some other genera are birds of scrublands.

Puff-throated babbler, Pellorneum ruficeps
Rufous-vented grass babbler, Laticilla burnesii

Laughingthrushes and allies
Order: Passeriformes Family: Leiothrichidae

The members of this family are diverse in size and colouration, though those of genus Turdoides tend to be brown or greyish. The family is found in Africa, India, and southeast Asia.

Brown-cheeked fulvetta, Alcippe poioicephala
Afghan babbler, Argya huttoni
Common babbler, Argya caudatus
Striated babbler, Argya earlei
Large gray babbler, Argya malcolmi 
Jungle babbler, Argya striata
Rufous-chinned laughingthrush, Ianthocincla rufogularis
White-throated laughingthrush, Pterorhinus albogularis
Streaked laughingthrush, Trochalopteron lineatum
Bhutan laughingthrush, Trochalopteron imbricatum
Variegated laughingthrush, Trochalopteron variegatum
Chestnut-crowned laughingthrush, Trochalopteron erythrocephalum
Rufous sibia, Heterophasia capistrata
Red-billed leiothrix, Leiothrix lutea

Kinglets
Order: PasseriformesFamily: Regulidae

The kinglets, also called crests, are a small group of birds often included in the Old World warblers, but frequently given family status because they also resemble the titmice.

Goldcrest, Regulus regulus

Wallcreeper
Order: PasseriformesFamily: Tichodromidae

The wallcreeper is a small bird related to the nuthatch family, which has stunning crimson, grey and black plumage.

Wallcreeper, Tichodroma muraria

Nuthatches
Order: PasseriformesFamily: Sittidae

Nuthatches are small woodland birds. They have the unusual ability to climb down trees head first, unlike other birds which can only go upwards. Nuthatches have big heads, short tails and powerful bills and feet.

Chestnut-bellied nuthatch, Sitta castanea
Kashmir nuthatch, Sitta cashmirensis
White-cheeked nuthatch, Sitta leucopsis
Eastern rock nuthatch, Sitta tephronota
Velvet-fronted nuthatch, Sitta frontalis

Treecreepers
Order: PasseriformesFamily: Certhiidae

Treecreepers are small woodland birds, brown above and white below. They have thin pointed down-curved bills, which they use to extricate insects from bark. They have stiff tail feathers, like woodpeckers, which they use to support themselves on vertical trees.

Hodgson's treecreeper, Certhia hodgsoni
Bar-tailed treecreeper, Certhia himalayana

Wrens
Order: PasseriformesFamily: Troglodytidae

The wrens are mainly small and inconspicuous except for their loud songs. These birds have short wings and thin down-turned bills. Several species often hold their tails upright. All are insectivorous.

Eurasian wren, Troglodytes troglodytes

Dippers
Order: PasseriformesFamily: Cinclidae

Dippers are a group of perching birds whose habitat includes aquatic environments in the Americas, Europe and Asia. They are named for their bobbing or dipping movements.

White-throated dipper, Cinclus cinclus
Brown dipper, Cinclus pallasii

Starlings
Order: PasseriformesFamily: Sturnidae

Starlings are small to medium-sized passerine birds. Their flight is strong and direct and they are very gregarious. Their preferred habitat is fairly open country. They eat insects and fruit. Plumage is typically dark with a metallic sheen.

European starling, Sturnus vulgaris
Rosy starling, Pastor roseus
Daurian starling, Agropsar sturninus (V)
Indian pied starling, Gracupica contra
Brahminy starling, Sturnia pagodarum
Chestnut-tailed starling, Sturnia malabarica
Common myna, Acridotheres tristis
Bank myna, Acridotheres ginginianus
Jungle myna, Acridotheres fuscus
Spot-winged starling, Saroglossa spilopterus

Thrushes and allies
Order: PasseriformesFamily: Turdidae

The thrushes are a group of passerine birds that occur mainly in the Old World. They are plump, soft plumaged, small to medium-sized insectivores or sometimes omnivores, often feeding on the ground. Many have attractive songs.

Grandala, Grandala coelicolor
Alpine thrush, Zoothera mollissima
Scaly thrush, Zoothera dauma
Orange-headed thrush, Geokichla citrina
Mistle thrush, Turdus viscivorus
Song thrush, Turdus philomelos (V)
Redwing, Turdus iliacus (V)
Eurasian blackbird, Turdus merula
Gray-winged blackbird, Turdus boulboul
Tickell's thrush, Turdus unicolor
Tibetan blackbird, Turdus maximus
White-collared blackbird, Turdus albocinctus
Chestnut thrush, Turdus rubrocanus
Black-throated thrush, Turdus atrogularis
Red-throated thrush, Turdus ruficollis
Dusky thrush, Turdus eunomus
Song thrush, Turdus philomelos

Old World flycatchers
Order: PasseriformesFamily: Muscicapidae

Old World flycatchers are a large group of small passerine birds native to the Old World. They are mainly small arboreal insectivores. The appearance of these birds is highly varied, but they mostly have weak songs and harsh calls.

Dark-sided flycatcher, Muscicapa sibirica
Asian brown flycatcher, Muscicapa dauurica
Brown-breasted flycatcher, Muscicapa muttui (A)
Spotted flycatcher, Muscicapa striata
Rufous-tailed scrub-robin, Cercotrichas galactotes
Indian robin, Copsychus fulicatus
European robin, Erithacus rubecula
Oriental magpie-robin, Copsychus saularis
White-rumped shama, Copsychus malabaricus
Blue-throated flycatcher, Cyornis rubeculoides
Tickell's blue flycatcher, Cyornis tickelliae
Rufous-bellied niltava, Niltava sundara
Verditer flycatcher, Eumyias thalassina
European robin,  Erithacus rubecula (V)
Indian blue robin, Larvivora brunnea
Common nightingale, Luscinia megarhynchos (V)
White-bellied redstart, Luscinia phaenicuroides
Bluethroat, Luscinia svecica
Blue whistling-thrush, Myophonus caeruleus
Little forktail, Enicurus scouleri
Spotted forktail, Enicurus maculatus
Himalayan rubythroat, Calliope pectoralis
Chinese rubythroat, Calliope tschebaiewi
Red-flanked bluetail, Tarsiger cyanurus 
Himalayan bluetail, Tarsiger rufilatus
Golden bush-robin, Tarsiger chrysaeus
Slaty-blue flycatcher, Ficedula tricolor
Rufous-gorgeted flycatcher, Ficedula strophiata
Ultramarine flycatcher, Ficedula superciliaris
Rusty-tailed flycatcher, Ficedula ruficauda
Taiga flycatcher, Ficedula albicilla 
Kashmir flycatcher, Ficedula subrubra
Red-breasted flycatcher, Ficedula parva
Little pied flycatcher,Ficedula westermanni
Blue-fronted redstart, Phoenicurus frontalis
Plumbeous redstart, Phoenicurus fuliginosus
Rufous-backed redstart, Phoenicurus erythronotus
White-capped redstart, Phoenicurus leucocephalus
Blue-capped redstart, Phoenicurus caeruleocephala
Common redstart, Phoenicurus phoenicurus 
White-winged redstart, Phoenicurus erythrogastrus
Black redstart, Phoenicurus ochruros
Chestnut-bellied rock-thrush, Monticola rufiventris
Blue-capped rock-thrush, Monticola cinclorhyncha
Rufous-tailed rock-thrush, Monticola saxatilis
Blue rock-thrush, Monticola solitarius
White-browed bushchat, Saxicola macrorhynchus
Siberian stonechat, Saxicola maurus
White-tailed stonechat, Saxicola leucurus
Pied bushchat, Saxicola caprata
Gray bushchat, Saxicola ferreus
Northern wheatear, Oenanthe oenanthe
Isabelline wheatear, Oenanthe isabellina
Hooded wheatear, Oenanthe monacha
Desert wheatear, Oenanthe deserti
Pied wheatear, Oenanthe pleschanka
Brown rock chat, Cercomela fusca
Variable wheatear, Oenanthe picata
Hume's wheatear, Oenanthe alboniger
Finsch's wheatear, Oenanthe finschii
Mourning wheatear, Oenanthe lugens
Persian wheatear, Oenanthe chrysopygia

Waxwings
Order: PasseriformesFamily: Bombycillidae

The waxwings are a group of birds with soft silky plumage and unique red tips to some of the wing feathers. In the Bohemian and cedar waxwings, these tips look like sealing wax and give the group its name. These are arboreal birds of northern forests. They live on insects in summer and berries in winter.

Bohemian waxwing, Bombycilla garrulus

Hypocolius
Order: PasseriformesFamily: Hypocoliidae

The hypocolius is a small Middle Eastern bird with the shape and soft plumage of a waxwing. They are mainly a uniform grey colour except the males have a black triangular mask around their eyes.

Hypocolius, Hypocolius ampelinus

Flowerpeckers
Order: PasseriformesFamily: Dicaeidae

The flowerpeckers are very small, stout, often brightly coloured birds, with short tails, short thick curved bills and tubular tongues.

Thick-billed flowerpecker, Dicaeum agile
Pale-billed flowerpecker, Dicaeum erythrorhynchos

Sunbirds and spiderhunters
Order: PasseriformesFamily: Nectariniidae

The sunbirds and spiderhunters are very small passerine birds which feed largely on nectar, although they will also take insects, especially when feeding young. Flight is fast and direct on their short wings. Most species can take nectar by hovering like a hummingbird, but usually perch to feed.

Purple sunbird, Cinnyris asiaticus
Crimson sunbird, Aethopyga siparaja
Mrs Gould's sunbird, Aethopyga gouldiae

Weavers and allies
Order: PasseriformesFamily: Ploceidae

The weavers are small passerine birds related to the finches. They are seed-eating birds with rounded conical bills. The males of many species are brightly coloured, usually in red or yellow and black, some species show variation in colour only in the breeding season.

Streaked weaver, Ploceus manyar
Baya weaver, Ploceus philippinus
Black-breasted weaver, Ploceus benghalensis

Waxbills and allies
Order: PasseriformesFamily: Estrildidae

The estrildid finches are small passerine birds of the Old World tropics and Australasia. They are gregarious and often colonial seed eaters with short thick but pointed bills. They are all similar in structure and habits, but have wide variation in plumage colours and patterns.

Red avadavat, Amandava amandava
Indian silverbill, Euodice malabarica
Scaly-breasted munia, Lonchura punctulata
Tricolored munia, Lonchura malacca (V)

Accentors
Order: PasseriformesFamily: Prunellidae

The accentors are in the only bird family, Prunellidae, which is completely endemic to the Palearctic. They are small, fairly drab species superficially similar to sparrows.

Alpine accentor, Prunella collaris
Altai accentor, Prunella himalayana
Robin accentor, Prunella rubeculoides
Rufous-breasted accentor, Prunella strophiata
Radde's accentor, Prunella ocularis
Brown accentor, Prunella fulvescens 
Black-throated accentor, Prunella atrogularis

Old World sparrows
Order: PasseriformesFamily: Passeridae

Old World sparrows are small passerine birds. In general, Old World sparrows tend to be small, plump, brown or grey birds with short tails and short powerful beaks. Old World sparrows are seed eaters, but they also consume small insects.

House sparrow, Passer domesticus
Spanish sparrow, Passer hispaniolensis
Sind sparrow, Passer pyrrhonotus
Russet sparrow, Passer cinnamomeus
Dead Sea sparrow, Passer moabiticus
Eurasian tree sparrow, Passer montanus
Yellow-throated sparrow, Gymnoris xanthocollis
Rock sparrow, Petronia petronia
Pale rockfinch, Carpospiza brachydactyla
White-winged snowfinch, Montifringilla nivalis
Black-winged snowfinch, Montifringilla adamsi
Blanford's snowfinch, Montifringilla blanfordi

Wagtails and pipits
Order: PasseriformesFamily: Motacillidae

Motacillidae is a family of small passerine birds with medium to long tails. They include the wagtails, longclaws and pipits. They are slender, ground feeding insectivores of open country.

Gray wagtail, Motacilla cinerea
Western yellow wagtail, Motacilla flava
Citrine wagtail, Motacilla citreola
White-browed wagtail, Motacilla maderaspatensis
White wagtail, Motacilla alba
Richard's pipit, Anthus richardi 
Paddyfield pipit, Anthus rufulus
Long-billed pipit, Anthus similis
Blyth's pipit, Anthus godlewskii
Tawny pipit, Anthus campestris
Upland pipit, Anthus sylvanus
Meadow pipit, Anthus pratensis
Rosy pipit, Anthus roseatus
Tree pipit, Anthus trivialis
Olive-backed pipit, Anthus hodgsoni 
Red-throated pipit, Anthus cervinus
Water pipit, Anthus spinoletta
American pipit, Anthus rubescens

Finches, euphonias, and allies
Order: PasseriformesFamily: Fringillidae

Finches are seed-eating passerine birds, that are small to moderately large and have a strong beak, usually conical and in some species very large. All have twelve tail feathers and nine primaries. These birds have a bouncing flight with alternating bouts of flapping and gliding on closed wings, and most sing well.

Common chaffinch, Fringilla coelebs
Brambling, Fringilla montifringilla
Black-and-yellow grosbeak, Mycerobas icterioides
Collared grosbeak, Mycerobas affinis
Spot-winged grosbeak, Mycerobas melanozanthos
White-winged grosbeak, Mycerobas carnipes
Hawfinch, Coccothraustes coccothraustes
Common rosefinch, Carpodacus erythrinus
Blyth's rosefinch, Carpodacus grandis
Pink-browed rosefinch, Carpodacus rhodochrous
Streaked rosefinch, Carpodacus rubicilloides
Great rosefinch, Carpodacus rubicilla
Red-fronted rosefinch, Carpodacus puniceus
Himalayan white-browed rosefinch, Carpodacus thura
Brown bullfinch, Pyrrhula nipalensis
Orange bullfinch, Pyrrhula aurantiaca
Crimson-winged finch, Rhodopechys sanguineus
Trumpeter finch, Bucanetes githagineus
Mongolian finch, Bucanetes mongolicus
Spectacled finch, Callacanthis burtoni
Dark-breasted rosefinch, Procarduelis nipalensis
Plain mountain finch, Leucosticte nemoricola
Black-headed mountain finch, Leucosticte brandti
Desert finch, Rhodospiza obsoleta
European greenfinch, Chloris chloris (V)
Yellow-breasted greenfinch, Chloris spinoides
Twite, Linaria flavirostris
Eurasian linnet, Linaria cannabina
Red crossbill, Loxia curvirostra 
European goldfinch, Carduelis carduelis 
Fire-fronted serin, Serinus pusillus
Eurasian siskin, Spinus spinus (V)

Old World buntings
Order: PasseriformesFamily: Emberizidae

The emberizids are a large family of passerine birds. They are seed-eating birds with distinctively shaped bills. Many emberizid species have distinctive head patterns.

Crested bunting, Emberiza lathami
Black-headed bunting, Emberiza melanocephala
Red-headed bunting, Emberiza bruniceps
Corn bunting, Emberiza calandra
Chestnut-eared bunting, Emberiza fucata
Rock bunting, Emberiza cia
Godlewski's bunting, Emberiza godlewskii
Meadow bunting, Emberiza cioides (V)
White-capped bunting, Emberiza stewarti
Yellowhammer, Emberiza citrinella (V)
Pine bunting, Emberiza leucocephalos
Gray-necked bunting, Emberiza buchanani
Ortolan bunting, Emberiza hortulana (V)
Striolated bunting, Emberiza striolata
Reed bunting, Emberiza schoeniclus
Yellow-breasted bunting, Emberiza aureola
Little bunting, Emberiza pusilla
Chestnut bunting, Emberiza rutila

See also
List of birds
Lists of birds by region
Birds of Islamabad

Notes

References

Pakistan
Pakistan
 
Birds